Brass knuckles are a metal device worn on the fingers in a fight.

Brass knuckles may also refer to:
Brass Knuckles (album), a 2008 album by Nelly
Brass Knuckles (Pluto), an area on the planet Pluto
Brass Knuckles (band), an electronic dance music trio
Brass Knuckles (film), a 1927 silent crime film